Three-time defending champions Martina Navratilova and Pam Shriver successfully defended their title, defeating Kathy Jordan and Anne Smith in the final, 6–3, 6–4 to win the ladies' doubles tennis title at the 1984 Wimbledon Championships. It was the second step in an eventual Grand Slam for the pair.

Seeds

  Martina Navratilova /  Pam Shriver (champions)
  Anne Hobbs /  Wendy Turnbull (second round)
  Kathy Horvath /  Virginia Ruzici (first round)
  Barbara Potter /  Sharon Walsh (semifinals)
  Rosalyn Fairbank /  Candy Reynolds (quarterfinals)
  Jo Durie /  Ann Kiyomura-Hayashi (semifinals)
  Kathy Jordan /  Anne Smith (final)
  Claudia Kohde-Kilsch /  Hana Mandlíková (quarterfinals)
  Andrea Leand /  Mary-Lou Piatek (second round)
  Christiane Jolissaint /  Marcella Mesker (second round)
  Leslie Allen /  Anne White (third round)
  Mima Jaušovec /  Virginia Wade (third round)
  Barbara Jordan /  Elizabeth Sayers (second round)
  Bettina Bunge /  Eva Pfaff (first round)
 n/a
  Zina Garrison /  Lori McNeil (second round, withdrew)

Draw

Finals

Top half

Section 1

Section 2

Bottom half

Section 3

Section 4

References

External links

1984 Wimbledon Championships – Women's draws and results at the International Tennis Federation

Women's Doubles
Wimbledon Championship by year – Women's doubles
Wimbledon Championships
Wimbledon Championships